Clyde Amel Blair (September 16, 1881 in Fort Scott, Kansas – September 3, 1953 in Santa Barbara, California) was an American track and field athlete who competed in the 1904 Summer Olympics.  In 1904 he was third  in 60 m competition and was third in his first round heat of 100 m competition and did not advance to the final. He also participated in the final of 400 m competition, but his exact placement is unknown.

References

External links
 

1881 births
1953 deaths
American male sprinters
Athletes (track and field) at the 1904 Summer Olympics
Olympic track and field athletes of the United States
People from Fort Scott, Kansas
Track and field athletes from Kansas
Chicago Maroons men's track and field athletes